HMS Collingwood was the lead ship of her class of ironclad battleships built for the Royal Navy during the 1880s. The ship's essential design became the standard for most of the following British battleships. Completed in 1887, she spent the next two years in reserve before she was assigned to the Mediterranean Fleet for the next eight years. After returning home in 1897, the ship spent the next six years as a guardship in Ireland. Collingwood was not significantly damaged during an accidental collision in 1899 and was paid off four years later. The ship was sold for scrap in 1909 and subsequently broken up.

Background and design

At the time of her design, she was not considered as being the forerunner of any class; she was designed by the Director of Naval Construction, Sir Nathaniel Barnaby, as a one-off as an answer to the French s, which carried three heavy guns on the centreline and a number of smaller pieces on the broadside. He made several proposals to the Board of Admiralty, but they were all rejected. It also substituted four smaller  guns for Barnaby's two  guns.

Barnaby was severely criticised, particularly by Sir Edward Reed, himself a former Chief Constructor of the Royal Navy, because Collingwoods waterline armour belt was concentrated amidships and did not extend to the ends of the ship. Reed believed that this weakness meant that the ship could be sunk from the consequent uninhibited flooding if her unarmoured ends were riddled by shellfire and open to the sea. Barnaby deliberately selected a hull shape with narrow, fine ends to limit the volume of the hull that could be flooded and situated the armoured deck below the waterline to prevent it from being pierced by enemy shells and flooding the lower part of the ironclad. Furthermore, he heavily subdivided the hull to limit the amount of water that could enter through any one hit and placed coal bunkers above the armoured deck to absorb the fragments from exploding shells. The price was that the ship lacked buoyancy at her ends and tended to bury her bow in oncoming waves rather than be lifted over them. Her speed was greatly reduced in a head sea and the resulting spray made working the guns very difficult. Collingwood tended to roll heavily and was not regarded as a good seaboat. Despite these issues, her basic configuration was followed by most subsequent British ironclads and predreadnought battleships until the revolutionary  of 1905.

She displaced  at normal load and had a complement of 498 officers and ratings.

The ship was powered by a pair of 2-cylinder inverted compound-expansion steam engines, each driving one propeller.

Armament and armour
The ship had a main armament of 25-calibre rifled breech-loading (BL)  Mk II guns. The four guns were mounted in two twin-gun barbettes, one forward and one aft of the superstructure. The barbettes were open, without hoods or gun shields, and the guns, mounted on a turntable, were fully exposed. They could only be loaded when pointed fore and aft with an elevation of 13°.

The secondary armament of Collingwood consisted of six 26-calibre BL  Mk IV guns on single mounts positioned on the upper deck amidships, three on each broadside. They fired  shells that were credited with the ability to penetrate  of wrought iron at 1000 yards. Beginning around 1895 all of these guns were converted into quick-firing guns (QF) with a much faster rate of fire. For defence against torpedo boats the ships carried a dozen QF 6-pounder  Hotchkiss guns and eight QF 3-pdr  Hotchkiss guns.

The main ammunition hoists were protected by armoured tubes with walls 10–12 inches thick.

Construction and career

Collingwood, named after Admiral Cuthbert Collingwood, Horatio Nelson's second-in-command in the British victory at the Battle of Trafalgar, was the second ship of her name to serve in the Royal Navy. The ship was laid down at Pembroke Dockyard on 12 July 1880 and launched by Mrs. Louise Chatfield, wife of the dockyard's Captain-Superintendent, Captain Alfred Chatfield, on 22 November 1882. While conducting gunnery trials on 4 May 1886, Collingwoods rear left gun partially shattered and all of the Mk II guns were withdrawn from service. They were replaced by heavier Mk Vw models with approximately the same performance. Excluding her armament, she cost £636,996. The ship was commissioned at Portsmouth on 1 July 1887 for Queen Victoria's Golden Jubilee Fleet review and was paid off into reserve in August.

Collingwood was recommissioned for the annual summer manoeuvres for the next two years, before she was assigned to the Mediterranean Fleet, where she served from November 1889 until March 1897, with a refit in Malta in 1896. Captain Charles Penrose-Fitzgerald commanded the ironclad when she joined the Mediterranean Fleet in 1889. The ship became the coastguard ship at Bantry, Ireland, upon her return. Collingwood accidentally collided with the cruiser  in Plymouth harbour on 23 January 1899, badly damaging the latter ship, but was not significantly damaged herself. The ship was paid off into the reserve in June 1903 and was transferred to East Kyle in January 1905. Collingwood remained there until she was sold for scrap to Hughes Bolckow at Dunston, Tyne and Wear for £19,000 on 11 May 1909.

Notes

References

 
 
 
 
 
 
 
 
 
 

 

Admiral-class battleships
Victorian-era battleships of the United Kingdom
Ships built in Pembroke Dock
1882 ships